Narungga is a single-member electoral district for the South Australian House of Assembly. It was created by the redistribution of 2016, and was contested for the first time at the 2018 state election. It is named for the Narungga people who are the traditional owners of the lands in most of the electorate. It is one of two state districts named after South Australia's indigenous people (the other being the electoral district of Kaurna).

Description
Narungga is essentially a reconfigured version of the former seat of Goyder, which itself was created in 1969 as a replacement for Yorke Peninsula. At its creation, it drew 21,993 electors from Goyder and 2,325 from Frome. Of the remaining electors from Goyder, 999 were lost to Frome, 422 to Schubert, and 1,619 to Taylor.

Steven Griffiths had been the member for Goyder since 2006. He announced on 14 February 2017 that he would be retiring from parliament at the 2018 election. Narungga is held by the Liberal Party with a comfortable 13.8% notional margin on the new boundaries. Counting its time as Goyder and Yorke Peninsula, the seat has been held by the Liberals and their predecessors, the Liberal and Country League, for all but seven years since the institution of single-member seats in 1938. It has never been won by the Labor Party in either of its incarnations.

Geography
At its creation, Narungga covered Yorke Peninsula and nearby areas. It includes the Yorke Peninsula Council, District Council of the Copper Coast, District Council of Barunga West and included the western parts of the Wakefield Regional Council and Adelaide Plains Council.

Members for Narungga

Election results

Notes

References
 ECSA profile for Narungga: 2018
 ABC profile for Narungga: 2018
 Poll Bludger profile for Narungga: 2018

Narungga